Hero of Labour of Kazakhstan ( / Qazaqstannyń Eńbek Eri) is one of the highest titles of Kazakhstan, awarded for notable achievements in the economic and social development of the country. Recipients of the award are also awarded the Order of Otan. The award was established on 1 December 2008 and first awarded on 16 December 2008 after a presidential decree on 5 December. Not to be confused with the Order Labor Glory, it is the successor of the Soviet title Hero of Socialist Labour and the civil variant of the Hero of Kazakhstan award.

Description of the medallion 
The medallion of the award consists of a seven-pointed star with a wreath of wheat in the center surrounding an image of an open book in the background, with a computer in front of the left page and a ladle pouring molten metal in front of the right page engraved on the obverse side. The reverse side of the medallion contains the inscription "Қазақстанның Еңбек Ері" (Hero of Labour of Kazakhstan). The medallion is suspended by a pentagonal metal plate partially covered by a blue ribbon 41 mm tall and 34 mm wide.

Notable recipients 
26 people have received the award, including the following:
 Nursultan Nazarbayev, former president of Kazakhstan
 Sergey Tereshchenko, former prime minister
 Abish Kekilbayev, writer
 Olzhas Suleimenov, poet and anti-nuclear activist
 Akhmetzhan Yessimov, former mayor of Almaty
 Zhaqsylyq Üshkempirov, Olympic gold medalist
 Serik Akshulakov, neurosurgeon
 Yuri Pyat, cardiovascular surgeon

See also
Orders, decorations, and medals of Kazakhstan
 Hero of Socialist Labour (Soviet era predecessor)

References

Orders, decorations, and medals of Kazakhstan
Business and industry awards
Hero (title)
Awards established in 2008